BPI fold-containing family B, member 2, (BPIFB2) also known as bactericidal/permeability-increasing protein-like 1, (BPI-like 1) is a protein that in humans is encoded by the BPIFB2 gene.

Superfamily 

BPIFB2 is a member of a BPI fold protein superfamily defined by the presence of the bactericidal/permeability-increasing protein fold (BPI fold) which is formed by two similar domains in a "boomerang" shape.  This superfamily is also known as the BPI/LBP/PLUNC family or the BPI/LPB/CETP family. The BPI fold creates apolar binding pockets that can interact with hydrophobic and amphipathic molecules, such as the acyl carbon chains of lipopolysaccharide found on Gram-negative bacteria, but members of this family may have many other functions.  

Genes for the BPI/LBP/PLUNC superfamily are found in all vertebrate species, including distant homologs in non-vertebrate species such as insects, mollusks, and roundworms. Within that broad grouping is the BPIF gene family whose members encode the BPI fold structural motif and are found clustered on a single chromosome, e.g., Chromosome 20 in humans, Chromosome 2 in mouse, Chromosome 3 in rat, Chromosome 17 in pig, Chromosome 13 in cow. The BPIF gene family is split into two groupings, BPIFA and BPIFB. In humans, BIPFA consists of 3 protein encoding genes BPIFA1, BPIFA2, BPIFA3, and 1 pseudogene BPIFA4P; while BPIFB consists of 5 protein encoding genes BPIFB1, BPIFB2, BPIFB3, BPIFB4, BPIFB6 and 2 pseudogenes BPIFB5P, BPIFB9P. What appears as pseudogenes in humans may appear as fully functional genes in other species.

In humans, the BPIFB2 gene was first identified as a BPIL3 gene  whose encoded protein was called LPLUNC2 (long-palate lung and nasal epithelium clone 2), but subsequently PLUNC proteins were classified as a subfamily of the BPI fold superfamily. In humans, the BPIFB2 gene is found with other members of the BPI/LBP/PLUNC superfamily in a cluster on Chromosome 20.

Function 
The BPIFB2 protein is involved in the innate immune response to bacterial exposure in the mucosa of the mouth, nasal cavities, and lungs, like other closely related BPIFB proteins. In particular, it is highly expressed in normal salivary glands and esophagus as well as in hypertrophic tonsils in humans. In chronic rhinosinusitis BPIFB2/LPLUNC2 levels are profoundly reduced which has been interpreted as a defect in the release of glandular innate defense molecules.

References

External links

Further reading 

 
 
 
 

Human proteins
Genes
Genes on human chromosome 20